The 2008 CIS Women's Volleyball Championship was held February 28, 2008 to March 1, 2008, in Fredericton, New Brunswick, to determine a national champion for the 2007–08 CIS women's volleyball season. The tournament was played at the Aitken University Centre and was hosted by the University of New Brunswick. It was the first time that the University of New Brunswick had hosted the tournament.

The fourth-seeded UBC Thunderbirds won a five-set gold medal match over the Montreal Carabins to win their first national championship since 1978. UBC had won medals in seven of the previous 13 tournaments, but had fallen short of a gold medal win, including in 2005 and 2006 when they lost to Sherbrooke and Laval, respectively. Notably, from this year's championship team, Carla Bradstock's and Kyla Richey's mothers were members of the 1978 Thunderbirds team that had last won a national championship for UBC.

Participating teams

Championship bracket

Consolation bracket

Awards

Championship awards 
CIS Tournament MVP – Carla Bradstock, UBC
R.W. Pugh Fair Play Award – Stéphanie Amyot, Sherbrooke

All-Star Team 
Carla Bradstock, UBC
Liz Cordonier, UBC
Jamie Broder, UBC
Laetitia Tchoualack, Montréal
Janie Guimond, Montréal
Holly Harper, Calgary
Daryll Roper, Alberta

References

External links 
 Tournament Web Site

U Sports volleyball
2008 in women's volleyball
University of New Brunswick